The Sleeper is a 2012 American slasher film written and directed by Justin Russell.

Plot 

In 1979, a giggling man with milky white eyes (credited as "The Sleeper") breaks into a bedroom in the Alpha Gamma Theta sorority house in the middle of the night, killing a resident with a hammer. Two years later, the sorority is organizing a party to welcome new pledges, an event that prompts the return of the Sleeper, who has been living on the campus in secret, spying on the Alpha Gamma Thetas, and threatening them over the phone.

On the day of the party, the Sleeper sneaks into the sorority, kills Cindy by bashing her face in with a hammer, and hides her body. By the next day, the girls find Cindy missing and so does Bobby. Later that night the Sleeper strikes again, ripping Rebecca's face off using the claw of his hammer in a gym's locker room. He then moves on to killing Stacy, her suitor Derek, and an employee at a pool hall. As these homicides occur, Cindy's boyfriend Bobby goes to the police to report Cindy's disappearance, and he and Detective Drake learn that Rebecca and Stacy have gone missing after the detective calls the sorority. Drake sends Bobby home, and goes to the sorority while the Sleeper kills Matt, a boy who had walked Alpha Gamma Theta pledge Amy to her dormitory.

Amy discovers she has been left a message by the Sleeper just before Drake calls to ask her if she has seen any of the missing co-eds. Drake advises Amy to come to the Alpha Gamma Theta house (where they are setting up a phone tap) when she tells him about the message she had received. The Sleeper's calls are traced to an old storm cellar in Jacob's Hall, so Drake heads there. Two officers are left to watch the house, but the Sleeper manages to get inside, and kills everyone in the building (including Bobby when he drops by) besides Amy. The Sleeper wounds Drake when he returns, chases Amy through the campus, and to his lair, where Amy stabs him.

Amy is found by a patrolling officer, and taken to a hospital, where she is informed by a doctor that Drake is in the ICU, and the Sleeper was caught. As she tries to rest, Amy is bothered but then answers a nearby ringing phone and screams when she realizes that the killer is on the line.

Cast 

 Brittany Belland as Amy
 E. Ray Goodwin as Detective Drake
 Jason Jay Crabtree as The Sleeper
 Elizabeth Lane as June
 Jenna Fournier as Laura
 Riana Ballo as Stacy
 Jessica Cameron as Cindy
 Tiffany Arnold as Rebecca
 Ali Ferda as Ava
 Kendra Stevenson as First Sister
 Beverly Kristy as Miss Joy
 Paul Moon as Bobby
 Eric Sarich as Derek
 Aaron Russell as Matt Matheson
 Joe Bob Briggs as Dr Briggs

Production 

The Sleeper was filmed in Springfield, Ohio over thirteen days in February 2011.

Release 

The Sleeper was released on DVD, video-on-demand, and a combination DVD and VHS pack on January 31, 2012.

Reception 

Steve Barton of Dread Central gave The Sleeper a four out of five, and stated that it "stands as the best homage to early eighties filmmaking since Ti West's amazing The House of the Devil". The film also made it as an honorable mention on one of the website's "Best of 2012" lists, where Matt Serafini wrote "it gets everything right: the pacing, the atmosphere, the settings... Russell nails it. Here's a guy who understands the slasher film, and I look forward to his next outing as a result".

The attempt to recreate an eighties atmosphere was criticized by Film Bizarros Preston Carnell, who felt the film was trying so hard in that department that it became annoying and distracting. Other than that, Carnell gave The Sleeper a positive review, stating it had good atmosphere, cinematography, and death scenes, and passable acting. David Andreas of Splatter Critic reacted negatively to The Sleeper, giving it a 1½ out of 4, and writing that it "tries to come off as a throwback to '80s slashers, but mostly duplicates the faults that ruin films of any decade. Poorly acted, completely illogical, and with the worst line dancing since Howling: New Moon Rising.

See also
 The Sleeper (2000 film)

References

External links 

 
 
 

2012 films
2010s teen horror films
2012 horror films
2010s slasher films
American independent films
American slasher films
American teen horror films
2010s female buddy films
Films about fraternities and sororities
Films set in 1979
Films set in 1981
Films set in St. Louis
Films shot in Ohio
Mass murder in fiction
American police detective films
Direct-to-video horror films
American direct-to-video films
2010s serial killer films
2010s English-language films
2010s American films